Autódromo Ciudad de Paraná is a  motorsports circuit located in Entre Ríos, Argentina. It has hosted events in the TC2000, Top Race V6 and Turismo Carretera series and till 2011 also of the South American Formula Three Series, namely the Formula 3 Sudamericana.

Events

 Former
 Formula 3 Sudamericana (1988, 1990, 1994–2005, 2011)
 South American Super Touring Car Championship (2000)
 TC2000 Championship (1983–1984, 1988–2002, 2004–2006, 2008, 2011, 2014, 2016–2017, 2019, 2021)
 Top Race V6 (2000, 2002–2012, 2015–2019, 2021)
 Turismo Carretera (1997–2019, 2021–2022)
 Turismo Nacional (2004–2005, 2007–2008, 2012, 2021–2022)

Lap records 

The official fastest race lap records at the Autódromo Ciudad de Paraná are listed as:

References

Motorsport venues in Entre Ríos Province